Golestan Rural District is a rural district (dehestan) in the Central District of Garmeh County, North Khorasan Province, Iran. At the 2006 census, its population was 4,734, in 1,236 families.  The rural district has 31 villages.

References 

Rural Districts of North Khorasan Province
Garmeh County